Orkney Herald of Arms is a Scottish herald of arms in the Court of the Lord Lyon.

The title is locative in origin, from the Orkney Isles or the creation of the Earls of Orkney. It was probably created in late period.

The badge of office is Two dragons’ heads erased and addorsed their necks entwined Or breathing flames of fire Gules all ensigned of the Crown of Scotland Proper.

The office was last held by Sir Malcolm Innes of Edingight, the former Lord Lyon King of Arms. He was appointed to this post on 9 February 2001. The office became vacant upon his death in September 2020.

Holders of the office

See also
Officer of Arms
Herald
Court of the Lord Lyon
Heraldry Society of Scotland

References

External links
The Court of the Lord Lyon



Court of the Lord Lyon
Offices of arms